Keenan Evans (born August 23, 1996) is an American professional basketball player for Žalgiris Kaunas of the Lithuanian Basketball League (LKL) and the EuroLeague. He played college basketball at Texas Tech University.

College career
A 6’3” point guard, after Evans starred at Lloyd V. Berkner High School in Richardson, Texas, he committed to Texas Tech to play for coach Tubby Smith. When Smith left Texas Tech to become head coach at Memphis, Evans stayed to play for Chris Beard, Smith's replacement.

As a junior, Evans averaged 15.4 points (7th in the Big 12) and 3 assists a game, was second in free throw percentage (.849) and ninth in field goal percentage (.464) in the Big 12, and was named third-team All-Big 12 Conference for the 2016–17 season.

As a senior in 2017–18, Evans emerged as the primary scoring option for the Red Raiders and led them to a top ten ranking during the season. He scored one of the most memorable baskets of the Red Raiders’ season as he hit a game-winner against in-State rival Texas on February in a game where he scored a career-high 38 points. Evans was named to the late-season watch lists for the Wooden Award and the Bob Cousy Award. For the season, he was averaged 17.6 points per game (2nd in the Big 12), and was 6th in field goal percentage (.471) and 7th in free throw percentage (.817).

Professional career

Grand Rapids Drive (2018–2019)
After going undrafted in the 2018 NBA draft, Evans signed a contract with the Golden State Warriors for their summer league team. He later signed a two-way contract with the Detroit Pistons. On January 15, 2019, Evans was waived by the Pistons, but was retained on the Drive roster.

Delaware Blue Coats (2019)
On January 22, 2019, Evans was traded to the Delaware Blue Coats along with the returning player rights to Chris Horton in exchange for the returning player rights to Shawn Long and Devondrick Walker.

Igokea (2019–2020)
On July 26, 2019, Evans signed a one-year contract for Igokea of the Adriatic League.

Hapoel Haifa (2020–2021)
In July 2020, he joined Hapoel Haifa of the Israel Basketball Premier League. In 2020–21 he was sixth in the Israel Basketball Premier League in points per game (18.7), fourth in assists per game (6.2), second in steals per game (2.0), and ninth in free throw percentage (85.5 per cent), while also leading the league in efficiency (25.7 PIR).

Maccabi Tel Aviv (2021–2022)
On July 6, 2021, Evans signed a one-year deal with Maccabi Tel Aviv of the Israeli Basketball Premier League and the EuroLeague, with an option for two additional years. On July 12, 2022, Evans officially parted ways with the Israeli club.

Žalgiris Kaunas (2022–present)
On July 12, 2022, Evans signed a two-year contract with Žalgiris Kaunas of the Lithuanian Basketball League (LKL) and the EuroLeague. On December 23, 2022, Evans recorded a career-high 32 points, shooting 11-of-15 from the field, along with four rebounds, four assists and two steals for a 39 PIR in a 75–67 win over Bayern Munich. He was subsequently named EuroLeague Round 15 MVP. On January 5, 2023, in a 86-66 Euroleague win over Fenerbahce Istanbul, Evans suffered a torn Achilles tendon which sidelined him for the rest of the season.

Career statistics

College

|-
| style="text-align:left;"| 2014–15
| style="text-align:left;"| Texas Tech
| 32 || 3 || 18.2 || .369 || .302 || .716 || 2.0 || 1.4 || .8 || .3 || 5.8
|-
| style="text-align:left;"| 2015–16
| style="text-align:left;"| Texas Tech
| 32 || 31 || 25.1 || .412 || .375 || .756 || 2.9 || 2.9 || 1.0 || .3 || 8.7
|-
| style="text-align:left;"| 2016–17
| style="text-align:left;"| Texas Tech
| 31 || 30 || 30.4 || .464 || .432 || .849 || 2.8 || 3.0 || 1.0 || .2 || 15.4
|-
| style="text-align:left;"| 2017–18
| style="text-align:left;"| Texas Tech
| 36 || 35 || 29.5 || .471 || .320 || .817 || 3.0 || 3.2 || 1.1 || .3 || 17.6
|- class="sortbottom"
| style="text-align:center;" colspan="2"| Career
| 131 || 99 || 25.9 || .444 || .360 || .797 || 2.7 || 2.6 || 1.0 || .3 || 12.0

EuroLeague

|-
| align="left" | 2021–22
| align="left" | Maccabi
| 33 || 32 || 25.2 || .442 || .329 || .879 || 2.5 || 3.5 || 1.2 || .2 || 8.2 || 10.2
|-
| align="left" | 2022–23
| align="left" | Žalgiris
| 17 || 17 || 26.2 || .506 || .458 || .812 || 3.2 || 3.7 || 1.0 || .2 || 15.9 || 17.4
|- class="sortbottom"
| align="center" colspan="2"| Career
| 50 || 49 || 25.5 || .470 || .398 || .844 || 2.7 || 3.5 || 1.1 || .2 || 10.8 || 12.7

Personal life
Evans is the son of Olympic high jumper Kenny Evans.

References

External links
EuroLeague profile
Proballers.com profile
RealGM.com profile
College stats @ sports-reference.com
Texas Tech Red Raiders bio

1996 births
Living people
21st-century African-American sportspeople
ABA League players
African-American basketball players
All-American college men's basketball players
American expatriate basketball people in Bosnia and Herzegovina
American expatriate basketball people in Israel
American expatriate basketball people in Lithuania
American men's basketball players
Basketball players from Texas
BC Žalgiris players
Delaware Blue Coats players
Grand Rapids Drive players
Hapoel Haifa B.C. players
KK Igokea players
Maccabi Tel Aviv B.C. players
People from Richardson, Texas
Point guards
Shooting guards
Sportspeople from the Dallas–Fort Worth metroplex
Texas Tech Red Raiders basketball players